Taekwondo was contested at the 2019 Summer Universiade from 7 to 13 July 2019 at the Palazzetto Sport Casoria in Naples.

Medal summary

Medal table

Men's events

Women's events

Mixed events

References

External links
2019 Summer Universiade – Taekwondo
Results book (Archived version)

 
Universiade
2019 Summer Universiade events
2019